Jean Dolce (?, Bayonne - 8 February 1681) was a French cleric who became bishop of Boulogne from 1633 to 1643, allowing the first Minimes house in the city in 1642. He was made bishop of Agde in 1643 but before he could be installed was transferred to be bishop of Bayonne. His uncle was Bertrand d'Eschaux, archbishop of Tours.

Sources
Eugène Van Drival, Histoire des évêques de Boulogne, Boulogne-sur-Mer, Berger frères, 1852

Bishops of Agde
Bishops of Bayonne
Bishops of Boulogne
1681 deaths
People from Bayonne